Hnativka is the name of several places in Ukraine derived from the Ukrainian  given name Hnat. It may refer to:

A village, part of Bilohorodka
A village, part of Kostiantynivka
Former name of Avhustynivka

See also
Anatevka
Ignatovka, a Russian-language toponym with the same derivation